The 2004 Swindon Borough Council election took place on 10 June 2004 to elect members of Swindon Unitary Council in Wiltshire, England. One third of the council was up for election and the Conservative Party gained overall control of the council from no overall control.

After the election, the composition of the council was
Conservative 33
Labour 19
Liberal Democrat 7

Election result

Ward results

References

2004 English local elections
2004
2000s in Wiltshire